Tarunius punctatus is a species of beetles in the family Monotomidae, the only species in the genus Tarunius.

References

Monotypic Cucujoidea genera
Monotomidae